Andrea Hlaváčková and Lucie Hradecká were the defending champions, having defeated Melinda Czink and Arantxa Parra Santonja in the 2010 final, but they lost to the number 1 seeds, Cara Black and Anastasia Rodionova, in the quarterfinals.
Alisa Kleybanova and Anastasia Pavlyuchenkova won this year's edition. They defeated Klaudia Jans and Alicja Rosolska in the final.

Seeds

Draw

Draw

External links
 Doubles Draw

Doubles
Brisbane International - Women's Doubles